Simon Adam Wolfson, Baron Wolfson of Aspley Guise (born 27 October 1967), is a British businessman and currently chief executive of the clothing retailer Next plc, as well as a Conservative life peer. He is the son of the former Next chairman, The Baron Wolfson of Sunningdale, who was also a Conservative life peer.

Family and education 

Wolfson's great-grandfather, Solomon Wolfson, was a Jewish cabinet-maker who settled in Glasgow and had nine children, one of whom was Sir Isaac Wolfson, Simon's great uncle, who made his fortune through Great Universal Stores. Wolfson's father, Lord Wolfson of Sunningdale, was a former chairman of Next and Great Universal Stores, as well as being a Conservative life peer.

Wolfson is the eldest of three siblings. He attended Radley College, near Abingdon, followed by studying law at Trinity College, Cambridge.

Business career
Wolfson joined Next as sales assistant in its Kensington branch in 1991. The following year, he was taken on as assistant to Next's chief executive, David Jones. Wolfson was elevated within the company rapidly, being appointed to the board of directors in 1997, culminating in his appointment as chief executive in August 2001 but leading at least one city analyst to make allegations of nepotism. At the age of 33, this made him the youngest chief executive of a FTSE 100 company. He was one of the first businesspeople to predict the 2008–9 economic crisis.

In 2021 his pay package at Next was £3.4 million.

Relationship with staff
In 2013, he waived his £2.4 million bonus and gave it to the staff of Next who had been with the company since 2010. Wolfson earned £4.6m in 2013 at a time when the average pay of Next employees was £10,000. This led the GMB trade union supported by Paul Heaton to tour Next shops presenting anti-social behaviour awards to managers for their failure to provide a living wage. In 2014, for a second successive year, Wolfson waived his bonus and distributed it among staff, sharing some £3.8m.
In May Retail Week reported that Next staff would be up to £1000 a year worse off after the company decided not to pay a premium for staff working on a Sunday. Those refusing a change of employment terms were allegedly told they risked being made redundant. The GMB union accused Wolfson of having a "total disregard for family life."
In April 2017, the salaries of some of Next's most senior staff were cut following a 3.8% fall in profits though Wolfson's salary was raised by 1%.

Political views 
Wolfson is a prominent supporter of the Conservative Party, having donated to David Cameron's campaign in the 2005 leadership election and co-chaired the party's Economic Competitiveness policy review. He was named by The Daily Telegraph as the 37th-most important British conservative in 2007. He was one of 35 signatories to an open letter calling on the Chancellor of the Exchequer, George Osborne, to press ahead with the coalition government's plans to reduce the public finance deficit in one term in the face of opposition.

On 18 June 2010, Wolfson was created The Baron Wolfson of Aspley Guise, of Aspley Guise in the County of Bedfordshire, and was introduced in the House of Lords on 6 July 2010.

Views on Brexit
Wolfson was reported as being a supporter of Brexit in 2016. Following the success of the Leave campaign, Wolfson said Britain's success depended on international trade negotiations. In January 2017 Wolfson said the Government should declare its negotiating objectives and not rush things. In 2022, Wolfson suggested a tax on recruiting foreign workers as trade off to allow greater numbers of foreign workers into Britain.

Open Europe
In December 2016, Wolfson was appointed to the Chair of the Open Europe think-tank.

The Wolfson Economics Prize 
Wolfson is the founder of the £250,000 Wolfson Economics Prize.

Personal life 
Wolfson married Eleanor Shawcross in London in 2012. They had a son in 2013/14.

He owns houses in London and Aspley Guise.

See also
 Wolfson family

External links

References

1967 births
Living people
People educated at Radley College
Alumni of Trinity College, Cambridge
British businesspeople in retailing
Conservative Party (UK) life peers
Life peers created by Elizabeth II
English Jews
British Eurosceptics
People from Aspley Guise
Jewish British politicians
Sons of life peers
Wolfson